Ragunan Zoo (Indonesian: Kebun Binatang Ragunan) is a zoo located in Pasar Minggu, South Jakarta, Indonesia. The zoo has an aviary and a primate centre, and employs over 450 people. Many of the animals in the zoo are endangered and threatened from all parts of Indonesia and the rest of the world. There are a total of 2,288 animals inside the zoo. Laid out in a lush tropical habitat, rare animals such as crocodile, gorilla, orangutan, tapir, anoa, sumatran tiger, babirusa and peacocks are given ample room. The zoo is located in South Jakarta and is easily accessible through the Jakarta Outer Ring Road and TransJakarta Corridor 6 bus (grey color).

Ragunan Zoo originally opened on 1864. Therefore, the zoo is 159 years old. It is the oldest zoo in Indonesia.

History

The zoo was established in 1864 by a Dutch East Indies flora and fauna lovers organization, the Vereneging Planten en Dierentuin of Batavia. The zoo moved to its present location in 1966, and was officially opened on 22 June 1966, managed by the city administration. The former location was turned into the Taman Ismail Marzuki performing art center and Jakarta Art Institute.

Ragunan Zoo used to keep a pair of Sumatran rhinoceros, named Jalu and Dusun, from 1986 to late 1990's. The male Jalu is a wild rhinoceros caught from Sumatra, while the female Dusun came from Malacca Zoo. Jalu died at the zoo in 1994, Dusun is sent to the Way Kambas National Park and died there in 2001.

In July 2002, four western lowland gorilla arrived from Howletts Wild Animal Park, the four male gorillas are: Kumbo, Komu, Kihi, and Kidjoum. Kidjoum died in February 2008 following a fight with the other gorillas. The three remaining gorillas now become the zoo's main stars, housed in the Schmutzer Primate Center.

On 19 September 2005, following the order of the city's governor, the zoo was temporarily closed for about three weeks after various birds were found to have been infected by the avian influenza.

On January 1, 2015 Ragunan Zoo was visited by 186,456 visitors, the highest among the New Year days, the previous highest record was about 175,000 visitors on January 1, 2011.

In 2015, The Head of General Service Division of Ragunan Zoo said that in 2018, Ragunan Zoo is predicted to become an international standard for zoos, with the hiring of experts to improve the welfare and life quality of the animals, improving the quality of the cages, and improving facilities for visitors. Later that year, the zoo received 209 billion rupiah for subsidy from the local government.

As of April 2021, there are 2,288 animals and 335 animal species inside the zoo.

The Schmutzer Primate Centre

The Schmutzer Primate Centre was opened in 2002, within the Ragunan Zoo but privately funded and managed separately. It is one of the largest of such centers in the world. The  special enclosure houses various primates, including gorillas, chimpanzees and orangutans. The center was named after the late Pauline Antoinette Schmutzer, who donated her estate to the center. Dr Willie Smits of the Borneo Orangutan Survival Foundation designed the orangutan enclosure so that the orangutans have as natural an environment as possible. Thick dark glass allows visitors to see the orangutans while being invisible to them.

Exhibits
Beginning in February 2014, the zoo will be closed every Monday for maintenance and to provide a quiet day for the animals. If Monday is a holiday, the zoo will be open but will be closed on another day in lieu of the holiday.

Several primate cages houses various species of langurs, gibbons, and macaques, while the gorillas, chimpanzees, and orangutans are located in the Schmutzer Primate Centre. Small mammal compounds display binturongs, civets, porcupines, and others. Ragunan also displays large cats, like leopards and tigers. The cages for tigers, bears, and lions are located on the southeastern end of the zoo.

A pool with pelicans are located near the entrance. Several aviaries host the zoo's bird collection, including peafowls, eagles, mynas, hornbills, cockatoos, crowned pigeons, cockatoos, and pheasants. Large birds like cassowary and ostrich are displayed in separate compounds.

Species

Mammals 
East Javan langur
Silvery langur
Javan surili
Natuna Island surili
Siamang
Bornean orangutan
Capybara
Javan muntjac
Chital
Javan rusa deer
Sri Lankan leopard
Jaguar
Pygmy hippopotamus
Sumatran elephant
Reticulated giraffe

Birds 

Java sparrow
Bali myna
Eastern hill myna
Spotted dove
Western crowned pigeon
Sclater's crowned pigeon
Victoria crowned pigeon
Grey parrot
Eclectus parrot
Moustached parakeet
Galah
Citron-crested cockatoo
Triton cockatoo
Palm cockatoo
Red-and-green macaw
Large-billed crow
Buffy fish owl
Barred eagle-owl
Brahminy kite
Crested serpent eagle
Grey-headed fish eagle
White-bellied sea eagle
Black hornbill
Oriental pied hornbill
Wreathed hornbill
Maleo
Lady Amherst's pheasant
Silver pheasant
Java peafowl
Indian peafowl
Australian pelican
Javan pond heron
Grey heron
Grey crowned crane
Lesser flamingo
Greater flamingo
Lesser adjutant
South African ostrich

Reptile 
Gold-ringed cat snake
King cobra
Burmese python
Reticulated python
Two-striped water monitor
False gharial
New Guinea crocodile
Saltwater crocodile

Fish 
Tinfoil barb
Red-bellied piranha
Clown featherback
Iridescent shark
Giant snakehead
Asian arowana
Alligator gar

Other attractions

Special attractions for the children include a Children's Zoo, playground and rides, along with the Sunday events of pony cart and boat rides on Ragunan lake.

References

External links
 Official website (in English)

Zoos in Indonesia
Buildings and structures in Jakarta
Tourist attractions in Jakarta
South Jakarta